Petrovite is a blue and green mineral, with the chemical formula of Na10CaCu2(SO4)8. It contains atoms of oxygen (O), sodium (Na), sulphur (S), calcium (Ca) and copper (Cu) in a porous framework. It has potential as a cathode material in sodium-ion rechargeable batteries.

It was discovered in volcanic lava flows in the Kamchatka region of Russia's far east and first described in 2020.

References 

Sodium minerals
Calcium minerals
Copper minerals
Sulfate minerals
Minerals described in 2020